Aston Mullins is a hamlet in the parish of Dinton, in Buckinghamshire, England. At the 2011 Census the population of the hamlet was included in the civil parish of Dinton-with-Ford and Upton

References

External links

Hamlets in Buckinghamshire